The following is a list of events relating to television in Ireland from 1986.

Events
29 September – Long running Irish afternoon chat show Live at 3 begins on RTÉ 1.
29 September – RTÉ Television airs the first edition of Dempsey's Den, a series presented by Ian Dempsey with puppets Zig and Zag. Dempsey's Den presented children's afternoon programmes.
1 October – Welsh children's animation SuperTed begins its screening debut on RTÉ 1 as part of Dempsey's Den. The series is translated and dubbed into an Irish language.
9 November – The current affairs series Questions and Answers first goes on air. It is presented by Olivia O'Leary.

Debuts

RTÉ 1
14 January –  Alvin and the Chipmunks (Ruby Spears version) (1983–1987)
10 April –  Butterfly Island (1985–1987)
13 August – / The Campbells (1986–1990)
11 September – Pajo's Junkbox (1986–1988)
29 September – Dempsey's Den (1986–2010)
29 September – Live at 3 (1986–1997)
30 September – Rapid Roulette (1986–1990)
30 September –  The Prisoner of Zenda (1984)
1 October –  SuperTed (1983–1986)
25 October – Saturday Live (1986–1999)
9 November – Questions and Answers (1986–2009)
Undated –  Muppet Babies (1984–1991)

RTÉ 2
30 September –  Spaceflight (1985)
8 October –  Chocky (1984)
9 October –  Disney's Adventures of the Gummi Bears (1985–1991)
2 December –  Starman (1986–1987)
25 December –  Fox Tales (1986–1988)

Changes of network affiliation

Ongoing television programmes

1960s
RTÉ News: Nine O'Clock (1961–present)
RTÉ News: Six One (1962–present)
The Late Late Show (1962–present)

1970s
Sports Stadium (1973–1997)
The Late Late Toy Show (1975–present)
RTÉ News on Two (1978–2014)
Bosco (1979–1996)
The Sunday Game (1979–present)

1980s
Today Tonight (1982–1992)
Mailbag (1982–1996)
Glenroe (1983–2001)
MT-USA (1984–1987)

Ending this year
23 February – Davis at Large (1984–1986)
23 April – Leave It To Mrs O'Brien (1984–1986)

See also
1986 in Ireland

References

 
1980s in Irish television